Roast Battle is a British roast comedy show that is broadcast on Comedy Central. The show is hosted by Jimmy Carr and features comedians facing each other in roast battles.

The show was created by American comedians Jeff Ross and Brian Moses and is based on their Comedy Central series Jeff Ross Presents Roast Battle on which Carr has appeared as a contestant.

Concept, format and production
Roast Battle is based on Jeff Ross Presents Roast Battle, an American television series created by comedians Jeff Ross and Brian Moses that first aired on Comedy Central in 2016. The American series is based on a live show created by Moses and fellow comedian Rell Battle that runs at The Comedy Store in Los Angeles in the comedy club's Belly Room. Jimmy Carr participated as a contestant in Jeff Ross Presents Roast Battle first series.

Roast Battle premiered on Comedy Central in the UK and Ireland in 2018. The show is hosted by Carr and Moses acts as the announcer and the referee of each battle. The winner of each battle is determined by a panel of judges, including Carr. In the series' first series Katherine Ryan and Russell Brand served as judges. The second and third series featured Ryan and Jonathan Ross on the judges panel. The fourth series judges panel featured Ryan alongside a different guest judge each episode. These guest judges included Richard Ayoade, Big Narstie, Sara Pascoe, Noel Fielding and Joe Lycett.

The show is recorded at the Electric Brixton nightclub in London and is co-produced by James Corden’s production company Fulwell 73 and Carr's production company Ideasatron.

Reception
Roast Battle became Comedy Central's highest-rated UK commission.

In December 2018, a complaint was upheld by Ofcom after a trailer for the programme featured an anti-Semitic joke delivered by Jimmy Carr towards Tom Rosenthal, the latter of whom is of Jewish descent.

Transmissions

Episodes

The winner of each roast battle is in bold.

Series 1

Series 2

Specials

Series 3

Series 4

References

External links

2018 British television series debuts
2020 British television series endings
2010s British comedy television series
2010s British game shows
2020s British comedy television series
2020s British game shows
British stand-up comedy television series
Comedy Central game shows
English-language television shows